The Dubai Frame is an observatory, museum, and monument in Zabeel Park, Dubai. It holds the record for the largest frame in the world. The building has a height of 150.24 meters and a width of 95.53 meters. The building mainly serves as an observatory, providing views of old Dubai in the north and newer parts in the south.

The project idea was initially conceived by Fernando Donis, and selected as the winner of a design competition by an international jury. The designer has alleged that he had his intellectual property stolen and was denied credit for the design. The final project was completed by Hyder Consulting, part of Arcadis NV, and Al Rostamani Pegel was its principal contractor. It opened in January 2018.

Architecture competition
The design was selected as the winner of the 2009 ThyssenKrupp Elevator International Award from 926 proposals. Participants from all over the world were invited to submit an emblem that would promote “the new face for Dubai".

The ThyssenKrupp Elevator Architecture Award is an international architecture competition first held in 1988 and sponsored by one of the world's leading elevator companies. An international panel of judges selected the winning idea from among 926 design proposals to create a Tall Emblem Structure for Dubai. The original jury consisted of 11 international architects — a former and current chairman of the International Union of Architects (UIA) and the regional chairman of ThyssenKrupp Elevator. Dubai Municipality’s director general and Sheikh Hamdan Bin Rashid Al Maktoum were listed as ‘honorary’ jurors.

Donis' design was ultimately selected, for which he won an AED 367329.70 ($100,000) prize. According to Donis, when designing the structure he saw Dubai as a city full of emblems and rather than adding another one, they proposed to frame them all: to frame the city. Instead of building a massive structure, the purpose of the proposal was to build a void of 150 meters by 105 meters to continuously frame the development of the past, current, and future Dubai. To become the structure that celebrates yet constrains the city.

Design
The Dubai Frame is created out of glass, steel, aluminum, and reinforced concrete with designs of the logo of Expo 2020 embedded on the outer facade. It is positioned in such a way that representative landmarks of modern Dubai can be seen on one side, while from the other side, visitors can also view older parts of the city. An observation deck spans the top of the frame, with glass-bottomed floors looking down almost 150 meters onto the building's lower span. The lower span contains a museum showing the history of the city, and a video exhibit predicting the city's future.

Landscape design done by Architect Hoseein Shabani as freelance architect of MIRAK landscapes and irrigations.

the concept of combination of modern and traditional Dubai's Culture has implemented by architect.

Intellectual property controversy
Five years after Fernando Donis won the competition, Dubai Municipality released images of a redesigned Dubai Frame, which aside from its shape had little resemblance to the original design that was designed by Donis. According to Donis, he was offered a contract by Dubai Municipality, but one of the clauses stated that he waive his intellectual rights to the project and that he would not be able to use the completed design to promote his own practice. He said that clause was a direct breach of an earlier clause in the original competition brief which stipulated that the author will keep his copyright of his work. Donis refused to sign the clause, hence Dubai Municipality hired Hyder Consulting, a branch of Arcadis, to build and redesign the project. Thyssen Krupp described the controversy as “a commercial disagreement” and stated the company “does not have any possibility to interfere”. According to Dubai Municipality, the current Dubai Frame is very different from the one Donis made and Donis didn't have the proper licenses to work on the project.

In December 2016, Donis filed a lawsuit in the United States federal court against the Municipality of Dubai and ThyssenKrupp Elevator. In his lawsuit, Donis claims that he has not received either a contract or compensation for his design, despite it being currently under construction. In 2018, it was reported that Donis and the Municipality of Dubai were engaged in a legal dispute over ownership of the copyright for the building. New York-based lawyer Edward Klaris represented Donis in the United States federal court against the Dubai Municipality and ThyssenKrupp Elevator, but the case did not reach any conclusion.

See also
List of development projects in Dubai

References

External links

 Dubai Frame Will Become the Most Visited Place in UAE UAE Business Finder. Retrieved 1 January November 2016.
 Drop your jaws! The untold spectacular Dubai Frame is here. UAECentral.com Retrieved January 20, 2018.
 A guide to Dubai's newest landmark, now open in Zabeel Park. TimeOutDubai.com. Retrieved March 26, 2019.

2018 establishments in the United Arab Emirates
Buildings and structures completed in 2018
Buildings and structures in Dubai
Tourist attractions in Dubai
Landmarks in the United Arab Emirates